Ambrose Francis George Broderic Hartwell (28 June 1879 – 1940) was an English professional footballer who played as a centre half for Small Heath (later renamed Birmingham) and Bradford Park Avenue in the Football League. He also played in the Southern League for Queens Park Rangers, and in non-league football for a variety of clubs.

Notes

References

1870s births
1940 deaths
Sportspeople from Exeter
Footballers from Devon
English footballers
Association football defenders
Birmingham City F.C. players
Bradford (Park Avenue) A.F.C. players
Queens Park Rangers F.C. players
Kidderminster Harriers F.C. players
Shrewsbury Town F.C. players
Date of death missing
Place of death missing